Eschata chrysargyria is a moth in the family Crambidae. It was described by Francis Walker in 1865. It is found in Indonesia, where it has been recorded from Seram.

References

Chiloini
Moths described in 1865